Alfredo Reichlin (26 May 1925 – 21 March 2017) was an Italian journalist and politician.

Biography 
When he was very young, Reichlin took part in the Italian Resistance with the Garibaldi Brigades, as a member of the Patriotic Action Groups; captured by the fascists, Reichlin was providentially freed and saved.

In 1946, Reichlin joined the Italian Communist Party of which he has been one of the most important leaders. A pupil of Palmiro Togliatti, Reichlin has been vice-secretary of the Italian Communist Youth Federation and in 1958 he became editor-in-chief of L'Unità. In the 1960s he approached the positions of Pietro Ingrao, leader of the left-wing current of the party.

Elected to the Chamber of Deputies from 1968 to 1994, during the 1970s Reichlin entered the National Leadership of the party and worked side by side with Enrico Berlinguer and became once again editor-in-chief of L'Unità from 1977 to 1981.

In 1989, Reichlin became Minister of Economy of the Shadow Cabinet of the Italian Communist Party. He has later been in favor of the party's transformation from PCI to the Democratic Party.

Personal life 
Reichlin has been married to journalist and politician Luciana Castellina: they had two children, Lucrezia and Pietro, both of them economists.

He died in Rome on 21 March 2017, at the age of 91.

References

External links 
Files about his parliamentary activities (in Italian): V, VI, VII, VIII, IX, X, XI legislature.

1925 births
2017 deaths
People from Barletta
Italian Communist Party politicians
Democratic Party of the Left politicians
20th-century Italian politicians
21st-century Italian politicians
L'Unità editors